The Poland national futsal team is controlled by the Polish Football Association, the governing body for futsal in Poland and represents the country in international futsal competitions, such as the World Cup and the European Championships.

Tournament records

FIFA Futsal World Cup

UEFA European Futsal Championship

Grand Prix de Futsal

Current squad
The following players were called up to the squad for the UEFA Futsal Euro 2022

Head coach: Błażej Korczyński

Notable players
 Tomasz Ciastko
 Krzysztof Filipczak
 Krzysztof Jasiński
 Jarosław Kaszowski
 Krzysztof Kuchciak
 Andrzej Szłapa

Head coaches

See also
 Futsal in Poland
 Polish Futsal Ekstraklasa

References

External links
 Official website

Poland
futsal
Futsal in Poland